Kelly Anderson (born 20 April 1985, in Port Shepstone) is a former South African tennis player. Her career-high singles ranking is world No. 625, which she achieved in October 2008. Her highest doubles ranking is 135, reached in November 2008. Anderson played for the South Africa Fed Cup team numerous times. She also participated in WTA Tour doubles events regularly during the 2000s. Anderson retired from tennis 2010.

ITF Circuit finals

Doubles: 11 (6–5)

External links
 
 

1985 births
Living people
People from Port Shepstone
South African female tennis players
African Games silver medalists for South Africa
African Games medalists in tennis
Competitors at the 2007 All-Africa Games
White South African people
21st-century South African women